Nagzira Wildlife Sanctuary is Situated in Tirora, Arjuni (Sadak) & Goregaon Tahsils of Gondia District and Sakoli, Bhandara, Lakhni Tahsil of Bhandara district. The closest National Highway is NH-53. Nagzira Wildlife Sanctuary is locked in the arms of nature and adorned with a picturesque landscape, luxuriant vegetation and serves as a living outdoor museum to explore and appreciate nature. This sanctuary has a number of fish, 34 species of mammals, 166 species of birds, 36 species of reptiles and four species of amphibians. The invertebrate fauna includes a number of butterfly and other insect species. Large wild mammals present here include the Bengal tiger, Indian leopard, gaur, sambar, nilgai, chital, wild boar, sloth bear, Indian muntjac, Indian spotted chevrotain and dhole. There is also an Indian elephant named Rupa. Nearly 30,000 tourists visit this sanctuary annually.

Etymology
There is a temple of 'Naag' (Snake) which is exactly in the middle of nagzira and a temple of Mahadev. There was also a village inside the forest called as 'Nangthana' that adds up to the name of the forest. Nagzira got its name from this temple and 'zira' (zara) in Marathi means a perennial source of water that comes out from a hill in pongezara, Nagzira.

History
The Gond kings once ruled these forests in the vicinity of the Bhandara. In 1970,  was declared a Wildlife Sanctuary. In 2012, state government announced to merge this sanctuary with another national park to include in Saving tiger project

Significance
The Nagzira wildlife sanctuary is a miraculously preserved "green oasis" in the easternmost part of the Maharashtra State and has a great importance from bio-diversity conservation point of view.  This sanctuary is locked in the arms of nature and adorned with picturesque landscapes, luxuriant vegetation and serves as living outdoor museum to explore and appreciate nature.  This wildlife sanctuary is indeed nature’s priceless asset and beckons one and all to enjoy its picturesque landscape, its scenic beauty, its pure and fresh air.  It is really a boon to us and hence we must realise the real worth of this marvelous treasure house of nature and must protect it as a part of our national heritage. It has got immense potentials from bio-diversity conservation point of view and its values are discussed below.

Ecological or environmental values 
It is an important conservation unit in Central India in general and Vidarbha in particular.  It acts a "Green-lung" for the adjoining human settlements and helps in maintaining the environmental balance.

Wildlife

It is home of many endangered species.  The vertebrate fauna includes, besides a number of fishes, about 34 species of mammals, about 166 species of birds including migratory land and water birds, about 36 species of reptiles and about 4 species of amphibia.  This sanctuary is notable for its wealth of birds and is indeed a bird watcher’s paradise.  The zoological values of this sanctuary are briefly given below.

Invertebrates
This sanctuary is the abode of, besides innumerable other insect species, about 49 butterfly species belonging to 9 families; the most prominent include the common rose, common Mormon, lime butterfly, common sailor, common Indian crow and black rajah.

Mammals

Nearly 34 – species of mammal belonging to about 8 natural orders and 16 families are seen in this sanctuary, out of which about 14 species are of endangered status, namely the tiger, Indian leopard, jungle cat, small Indian civet, Asian palm civet, Indian wolf, golden jackal, sloth bear, honey badger, Indian giant flying squirrel, gaur, four-horned antelope, spotted deer, sambar deer, nilgai, Indian spotted chevrotain and Indian pangolin.

Birds 
The avifauna of this sanctuary is its most attractive wildlife feature.  Well over 166 species belonging to about 16 different orders and 47 families have been recorded here.  Also as many as 15 species of migratory birds and about 42 species of local migrants are reported. One remarkable bird, the bar-headed goose, is a winter migrant from Ladakh and Tibet and inhabits Chorkhamara tank located adjoining the sanctuary.  There are 13 bird species of endangered status including Indian peafowl and the birds belonging to the family Accipitridae.

Reptiles
This sanctuary is the abode of about 36 species of reptiles belonging to 2 natural orders and 11 families out of which about 6 species are of endangered status namely Indian rock python, dhaman, Indian cobra, Russell’s viper, checkered keelback and Bengal monitor.

Amphibia
This sanctuary is a home of many interesting varieties of frogs and toads like tree frogs, bull frogs, six-toed frogs, and an uncommon toad, Uperodon montanus.

Fishes
The Nagzira lake and the other water-bodies in and around this sanctuary abound in many varieties of fresh water fishes.

Bio-geographic zonation
As per the Biogeography classification adopted by Wildlife Institute of India, Dehradun, this sanctuary is classified as follows. 
i) Bio-geographic Kingdom - Paleotropical
ii) Sub Kingdom - Indomalaysian
iii) Bio-geographic Zone - 6 – Deccan Peninsula
iv) Biotic Province - 6 B – Central Deccan.
This Bio-geographic zone is one of the least protected bio-geographic zones in India, rich in floral and faunal diversities. Hence it needs high degree of protection.  Nagzira Wildlife Sanctuary is within the Central Deccan Plateau dry deciduous forests ecoregion.

Location
State: Maharashtra
District: Gondia and Bhandara
Tahsil: Situated in Arjuni (Sadak), Goregaon & Tiroda Tahsils of Gondia District and Sakoli Bhandara, Lakhni Tahsil of Bhandara district
Circle: Geographically the area of this sanctuary comes under the Nagpur Circle of the State Forest Department. 
The administration and management of this sanctuary comes under the control of the Chief Conservator of 
Forest (Wildlife), Nagpur.
Division : The administration and management of this sanctuary comes directly under Conservator of 
Forests (Wildlife),Bhandara and Gondia.
Ranges: The area of this sanctuary comes under the Nagzira range.

External and internal boundaries
The total length of the external boundary is 104.53 km out of which 74.93 km is an artificial boundary and 29.60 km 
length is natural boundary.  As per the notification the external boundaries are as follows.

On the North - Revenue village boundary of the village Khursipar Berdipar, Belapur, Hamesha, Kodebarra, Mangaezari.
On the East - Railway line Gondia to Chandrapur, Broad gauge section of South eastern Railway 
On the South - Pitezati fazal forests and Sakoli Range, village boundaries of Jamdi, Kosamtondi and Reserve Forest boundary.
On the West - Village boundary of Bhajepar, Chorkhamara, Chorkhamara-Pangdi Cart track and Reserve Forest boundary.

Village boundary
Thadezari is the only village geographically situated inside the sanctuary. This village boundary coincides with the Compt. Boundary. 
At present the sanctuary area is not classified into various zonation. So the zonation boundaries do not exist. All these types of boundaries need to be demarcated and mapped permanently. The boundary demarcation within the sanctuary should be distinct from the normal forest boundary.

Ecological boundaries
The forest area surround the sanctuary is a self-sufficient ecosystem with its living fauna and flora.  There is no marked difference between the vegetation and the topography of the surrounding areas with that of the sanctuary.  As the present sanctuary area is small, it is not viable in itself.  It is with these considerations the extension of this sanctuary is proposed and the same has been recommended by the Wildlife Institute of India’s study in the "Protected Area (PA) Network" for the State.

Forest types
The sanctuary has a diversity of plant community.  The major forest type is "Southern Tropical Dry Deciduous Forests" – 5 A/c 3 as per Champion and Seth’s Classification.

Mixed forests 
They are rarely semi-evergreen in hot season more or less without leaves. Thorny plants occur.  Bamboos are often present on slopes.  Grass is conspicuous, climbs are there. These forests occur over the large area in the sanctuary.  Generally good quality forests are found in pockets on deep moist soils in valleys and along nallas.  Erosion due to incidence of grazing is seen on the outskirts of the sanctuary near villages.  Average density of the crop in the stocked area is between 0.5 and 0.75.  The crop in general is young to middle age, with few matured trees in the over wood.  The major tree species are Terminalia tomentosa, Lagerstroemia parviflora, Anogeisus latifolia, Pterocarpus marsupium, Dispyrus melanoxylon, Tectona grandis, Bombax ceiba, Lannea grandis, BoswelIa serrata, Adina cordifolia, Xylia xylocarpa, along nallas Terinalia arjuna, Syzyguim cumini, Schleichera oleosa, Terinalia Chebula, Many Shrubs and Herbs like Holarrhena antidysentrica, Wrightia tinctoria.  Woodfordia fructicosa, Helicteres isora etc.  Climbers which are of common occurrence are Combretum decandrum, Zizyphus oenoplia, Calycopteris floribunda, Butea superba, Bauhinia vahlii, Smilax macrophylla, Mucuna pruriens, Acacia pinnata, Grass – Themeda quadrivalvia, Iseilema laxum. Apluda varia, Eragrostis tennella, Cynodon dactylon, Imperata cylindrica, near the lake – Vetiveria zizyniodes, Heteropogan contortus, Schima nervosum, etc. Bamboo on slope and along nallas.

Teak forests 
These forests occur on hill slopes though their extent is not much.  Besides this teak plantations, have been raised earlier.  These can be seen interspersed with natural forest.  The principal associates of the teak are Terminalia tomentosa, Anogeissus latifolica.  Pterocarpus marsupium, Lagerstroemia spp.. Madhuca indica and Bamboo- Dendrocalamus strictus.

Grasslands
Grassland can be seen near Nagzira but it is of small size and anthropogenic in origin.  Earlier Nagzira Forest village was located here which was later on shifted to Thadezari in this grassland encroachment by woody plants is advancing and needs to be checked.  Around 125 Ha.  Of grasslands exists.  These are located in compt.  No. 95, 96, 97, 98, 121, 125, 126.

Bamboo
Bamboo occurs in abundance over the central portion of the sanctuary where deep soil combined with moisture is seen. They grow as middle storey in teak as well as mixed forests.  There is no exploitation of Bamboo but illicit cutting is continuous threat and because of this Bamboo is either absent or of very poor quality in areas on the outer fringes of the sanctuary. 
It is evident that there is diversity in plant community. The communities have some distribution pattern, which has resulted into distribution of edges, interspersion and juxtaposition of habitats.

Species of conservation importance 
This sanctuary serves as a living repository of various economical, medicinal, aromatic, ornamental plant species.  Nearly 200 species of medicinal and economical importance are seen in this sanctuary.  So far, there is no record of any endemic or rare species form this sanctuary.  It is necessary to study the flora of this sanctuary in great detail for this purpose.  The help of an expert in flora identification needs to be sought in this regard.

Weeds
The most common weeds seen in this sanctuary are Lantana camera (Ghaneri) which is an exotic shrub and Parthenium spp.  (Congress grass) which is an exotic herb.  Weed infestation though on small extent is seen in the compartment nos. 86, 96, 97, 101. 109, 112, 116, 125 and 128.  The further spread of such weeds within the sanctuary should be checked and effective weed control methods like uprooting before flowering and then baring should be periodically cleared and be planted with suitable local fruit/fodder species useful for the existing wildlife.  The species suggested are Mango, Bor, Sitaphal, Wad, Jambul, local varieties of palatable grasses etc.

Museum

Museum and Interpretation Center
Presently a small museum at Nagzira tourist complex is being used for conservation education of tourists.  Here varieties of stuffed birds are kept in showcases. Some animal models, butterflies are also displayed at museum.  Also some photographs on wildlife, pugmarks, hoot-prints, plaster casts etc.  are also exhibited to educate the tourists.  This Museum is at its infancy and needs lot of further improvements.  Very few tourists visit the museum/ Interpretation Center.

Auditorium and audio-visual materials
Presently museum/ interpretation center is use as an auditorium to screen informative films and slides on wildlife, forests and nature. At present there are 8 films are lent out occasionally to other institutions like schools, colleges and other forest divisions.  At present only one 16 mm film projector, one 35 mm slide projector, one overhead projector as well as two tape recorders are available with the sanctuary. As there is no electricity within the sanctuary, the generator is used to operate these facilities.  Hence there is no need to develop facilities within the sanctuary.

Hides and machans
At present there are 5 watch cabins and 5 watchtowers located within the sanctuary.  This facilitates wildlife observation. The existing number of watch cabins/watch tower is quite inadequate and hence there is need to erect more watch cabins/ tower within the sanctuary during the plan period.

References 

Central Deccan Plateau dry deciduous forests
Wildlife sanctuaries in Maharashtra
Bhandara district
Tourist attractions in Maharashtra